Judaeo-Romance languages are Jewish languages derived from Romance languages, spoken by various Jewish communities (and their descendants) originating in regions where Romance languages predominate, and altered to such an extent to gain recognition as languages in their own right. The status of many Judaeo-Romance languages is controversial as, despite manuscripts preserving transcriptions of Romance languages using the Hebrew alphabet, there is often little-to-no evidence that these "dialects" were actually spoken by Jews living in the various European nations.

Languages

Judaeo-Aragonese

Judaeo-Aragonese was spoken in north-central Spain from the around the mid-8th century to around the time of the Alhambra Decree, which expelled Jews from Spain. Later, it either merged with the various Judeo-Spanish dialects or fell out of use, to be replaced by the far more influential Judeo-Spanish dialects from Southern Spain, especially in the areas occupied by the modern lands of Valencia, Murcia and Andalucia.

Judaeo-Catalan
Judaeo-Catalan was a Catalan dialect in Catalonia, Valencia and the Balearic Islands before the 1492 expulsion of the Alhambra Decree. It is unknown when Jews abandoned the language. While numerous Catalan texts written in the Hebrew language survive, whether or not they truly represent a dialect is debated. Some scholars, while conceding that the evidence for the language is scarce, still defend Judaeo-Catalan's status as a language, whereas other scholars deny such a language ever truly existed, or, contend that the evidence is too limited to take any position on the matter at all.

Judaeo-French

Judaeo-French was a Jewish language of Northern France, the Low Countries and western Germany.

Judaeo-Italian
Judaeo-Italian, sometimes called "Italkian", a term coined by Solomon Birnbaum in 1942, has gone extinct except for one variety, now spoken fluently by fewer than 200 people. They speak the last remnant of the widely variant Judaeo-Italian languages spoken throughout Italy and Corfu and along the eastern shores of the Adriatic Sea and the Ionian Sea. The language may have had some influence on the development of Yiddish.

Judaeo-Latin
Judaeo-Latin is a hypothetical language covering a range of geographical and register varieties of Latin. It is postulated to have been spoken in specific Jewish communities of the Roman Empire. A small corpus of Latin texts from the Middle Ages written in the Hebrew alphabet exist, but they are insufficient to indicate a commonly spoken ethnodialect, and thus the existence of a veritable Jewish Latin language is pure conjecture.

Judaeo-Occitan
There exists two distinct varieties of Occitan language spoken by Jews. 

Judaeo-Provençal was the language that developed in Provence and in the rest of medieval southern France. Judaeo-Occitan had several unique phonemic changes in Hebrew loanwords. Use of Judaeo-Provençal, as the use of Provençal, began to decline following the spread of French language in the southern parts of the country. This decline accelerated with the emancipation of the Jews in the wake of the French Revolution, which enabled French Jews to migrate and settle outside of Provence.

Another Jewish variety of Occitan, Judeo-Gascon, was spoken in Gascony until the early 20th century.

Judaeo-Piedmontese

Judaeo-Piedmontese was a language spoken in Piedmont, in North Western Italy from around the 16th century to the Second World War. It was based on Piedmontese, a Gallo-Italian language close to Provençal, with many loanwords from Classical Hebrew. Italian author Primo Levi, born within the Piedmontese Jewish community, described the language briefly in the opening chapter of his book The Periodic Table.

Judaeo-Portuguese 

Judeo-Portuguese was the language spoken by the secret Jewish population of Portugal until the 16th century when it was extinct. A few vestigial archaism forms survived in secret religious rituals through small, unique Crypto-Jewish communities in the Belmonte municipality.

Judaeo-Spanish
Judaeo-Spanish or Ladino is known by a number of other names. It is found in many varied regional dialects and is the modern descendant of the Spanish that was spoken by the Sephardi Jews, the descendants of Spain's large and influential Jewish population. After the 1492 Alhambra Decree mandated the expulsion of Spain's Jewish population of 300,000, Judaeo-Spanish spread throughout Europe and the Ottoman Empire, becoming the lingua franca of the Adriatic Sea. In 2017, it was formally recognised by the Royal Spanish Academy.

History and development
The exact development of the Judeo-Romance languages is unclear.  The two predominant theories are that they are either descended from Judeo-Latin, and that their development paralleled that of Latin's daughter languages or that they are independent outgrowths of each individual language community.  Another theory adopts parts of both, proposing that certain of the Judeo-Romance languages (variously, Zarphatic, Shuadit, Italkian and Catalanic) are descended from Judeo-Latin, but that others (variously, Zarphatic, Catalanic, Ladino, Judeo-Portuguese) are the product of independent development.

Present status
Most Judaeo-Romance languages are extinct or facing serious risks of extinction. Assuming they actually existed, Judaeo-Latin died in ancient times, while Judaeo-French and Judeo-Aragonese died in the Middle Ages. Judeo-Portuguese ceased being used in Portugal in the 16th century, but survived in the Jewish diaspora until the late 18th century. Judaeo-Catalan died sometime between the Middle Ages and the Second World War, when most of its speakers would have been exterminated in the Holocaust. Judaeo-Occitan became extinct when its last native speaker, Armand Lunel, died in 1977. Judaeo-Italian is critically endangered, being spoken by around 250 individuals in 2022. Judaeo-Spanish is spoken by the remaining Sephardic communities of the Maghreb in northern Africa, in the Middle East, especially in Turkey and Israel, which accounts for as many as 150,000 people; however, nearly all of this number speak at least one other language.

References
Jewish Languages Project
 Judeo-Aragonese: Revista de Filología Española (Cited as RFH:Hispánica?) 8.136-41 (1946) cited in Current Trends in Linguistics 9.1025

Specific